Skyhopper may refer to:

Skyhopper (Star Wars), a vehicle in Star Wars
Skyhopper (Transformers), a Transformers character
Aerotechnics Skyhopper-3000, a German ultralight trike 
Salvay-Stark Skyhopper, a low-wing single-place homebuilt aircraft